The Church of the Most Holy Trinity in Veseli, Minnesota (an unincorporated community in Wheatland Township, Minnesota) is a Catholic church designed by Clarence H. Johnston, Sr.  Johnston designed a large number buildings for state institutions in Minnesota, such as the Minnesota State Academy for the Deaf, the University of Minnesota, the former Minnesota Historical Society building, and many others, but churches were not common in his architectural practice.

Veseli was originally settled by Czech immigrants and was one of the four largest such communities in Minnesota. The members formerly worshiped at the parish in New Prague until they organized their own church in 1874. The first building was a wood frame structure built between 1874 and 1878. The present building was built in 1905 and follows an Italian Romanesque style, with some influences of Craftsman architecture as well. The entry has a round rose window with an eave above it, giving the appearance of a canopy.

Besides the church building, the parish has a school building built in 1916 and a convent and rectory built in 1926.

References

Churches on the National Register of Historic Places in Minnesota
Roman Catholic churches completed in 1905
Churches in Rice County, Minnesota
Churches in the Roman Catholic Archdiocese of Saint Paul and Minneapolis
Czech-American culture in Minnesota
Historic districts on the National Register of Historic Places in Minnesota
National Register of Historic Places in Rice County, Minnesota
1874 establishments in Minnesota
20th-century Roman Catholic church buildings in the United States